Robat-e Jaz (also Romanized as Robāţ-e Jaz, Robāt Jaz, and Robātjaz; also known as Rabāş Jaz, Ribāt-i-Gaz, Robāţ-e Gāz) is a village in Robat-e Jaz Rural District, in the Central District of Khoshab County, Razavi Khorasan Province, Iran. At the 2006 census, its population was 2,951, in 821 families.

References 

Populated places in Khoshab County